The Romance of Tiger and Rose is a 2020 Chinese streaming television series starring Zhao Lusi and Ding Yuxi, and tells the story of a young screenwriter who must survive after being trapped in her own script, with her character meant to die early in the story. The series airs on Tencent Video starting May 18, 2020.

The series became a hit on social media, with its hashtag garnering over 3 billion hits on Weibo. By June 2, the series received over 897 million views on Tencent Video.

Synopsis 
Despite facing criticism from fellow staff, Chen Xiaoqian (Zhao Lusi) exerts all her energy writing her drama screenplay. After falling into a well-earned nap, she finds herself transported into her own screenplay, becoming the hated third princess, Chen Qianqian, who is scheduled to be killed by the male lead, Han Shuo (Ding Yuxi) by episode three. Armed with knowledge of her own story, Chen Xiaoqian must struggle to keep herself alive as well as advance the plot forward by bringing her two lead characters together.

Cast 
Main cast

 Zhao Lusi as Chen Xiaoqian, a screenwriter / Chen Qianqian, infamous Third Princess of Huayuan city.
Dang Yixin as young Qianqian
 Ding Yuxi as Han Shuo, Prince of Xuanhu city
 Sheng Yinghao as Pei Heng, Minister of Education, Qianqian's fiance. 
 Zhou Zixin as Chen Chuchu, Second Princess of Huayuan City.
Shentu Hanqian as young Chuchu
Supporting Cast

 Quan Peilun as Su Mu, top musician and courtesan.
 Xiao Wei as Lin Qi, young mistress of the Lin family, managing the Royal Academy. 
 Chen Minghao as Su Ziying, Pei Heng's subordinate.
Zhao Xin as Chen Yuanyuan, Eldest Princess of Huayuan City
 Hu Caihong as Chief of Huayuan City
 Wu Yijia as Zi Rui, Chen Qianqian's servant
 Liu Shuyuan as Baiji, Han Shuo's servant
 Pan Luyu as Zi Nian
 Li Ang as Sang Qi
 Zhang Bofan as Zi Zhu 
 Han Zhigang as Housekeeper of Lin Manor
 Jin Yanqing as Pei Heng's subordinate
 Liu Xin as Storyteller
 Xue Yilun as Storyteller
 Wang Ming as Storyteller
 Guo Jiayi as Minister Hang, spy of Xuanhu city
 Zhang Haocheng as Chief of Xuanhu city, Han Shuo's father.
 Zhang Tingting as Madame of Xuanhu city, Han Shuo's mother.
 Ge Hao as Xuanhu envoy
 Shen Chi as Meng Guo 
 Ji Shan as Minister Liu
 Zhang Haoge as Zhang Yide
 Zhang Minghe as Minister Han
 Ning Xianzhou as Agent
 Fu Qiang as General Li
 Fu Jingying as Miss Li
 Qiu Xiao as Miss Wang 
 Shi Yan as Ceremonial Official
 Deng Ziyu as Examiner
 Zheng Yunjie as Judge

Production and release 
The show was filmed between August and October 2019 at Hengdian World Studios. The first poster and trailer was released on April 29, 2020, and was announced on May 11 of its exclusive broadcast on Tencent Video.

Soundtrack 

The Romance of Tiger and Rose OST's producer is Hong Chuan, who also worked on The Sleuth of the Ming Dynasty (2020) and Wait in Bejing (2020) original soundtracks.

Reception 
The Romance of Tiger and Rose has currently earned a 7.5 on Douban with more than 162,000 user reviews. It has been praised for its interesting setup and plot, although the gender swap dynamics presented in its matriarchal setting have been criticized for being inconsistent in its portrayal.

References

External links
 The Romance of Tiger and Rose on Weibo
 The Romance of Tiger and Rose on Douban

Television series by Tencent Penguin Pictures
Chinese historical television series
Chinese romance television series
2020 web series debuts
Tencent original programming
2020 Chinese television series debuts
2020 Chinese television series endings
Chinese romantic comedy television series